The 2008–09 Michigan Wolverines men's basketball team represented the University of Michigan in competitive college basketball during the 2008–09 NCAA Division I season. The 2008–09 season marked the team's ninety-second consecutive season as a member of the National Collegiate Athletic Association's (NCAA) Big Ten Conference.  The team finished the season with a 21–14 overall record and a 9–9 conference record. The 9–9 conference record tied for seventh place in the 2008–09 Big Ten conference standings. Michigan was seeded seventh in the single-elimination 2009 Big Ten Conference men's basketball tournament where it advanced one round.  They were seeded tenth in the South Regional bracket of the single-elimination 2009 NCAA Division I men's basketball tournament, where it also advanced one round before losing to the Blake Griffin-led Oklahoma Sooners. Jevohn Shepherd and David Merritt served as team co-captains, and Manny Harris and DeShawn Sims shared team MVP honors.

The 2008–09 season marked a turnaround for the team for several reasons. The team rebounded from a 10–22 overall record and a 5–13 conference record during the previous 2007–08 season. The season was highlighted by the team's first two wins in eleven years against teams ranked among the top five in the AP Poll, and by the team's first trip to the NCAA Division I men's basketball tournament since the 1998 tournament. Although the team had appeared in the 1998 NCAA tournament, the last appearance in the NCAA tournament that had been recognized in official NCAA records as not having been tainted by the University of Michigan basketball scandal was their 1995 tournament appearance.  The team was in its first year off scholarship probation, which following the scandal had restricted the number of available scholarships. However, the team continued to be prohibited from affiliating with implicated athletes (Chris Webber, Robert Traylor, Maurice Taylor, and Louis Bullock) until 2012, which meant, among other things, that the players could not help the University recruit.  The team began the season unranked, but in December 2008 it earned its first place in the top 25 since February 2006.  As the season progressed, the team adopted the slogan "Queme los barcos", which is Spanish for "burn the ships", as a reminder that there was no turning back.

For the forty-second consecutive season, the team played its home games in Ann Arbor, Michigan at the Crisler Arena, which has a capacity of 13,751.  John Beilein was in his second season as head coach with the team during the 2008–2009 season.  At the conclusion of the season, guard Manny Harris was named to the All-Big Ten first team, and forward DeShawn Sims was selected by the Big Ten media to the second team and chosen by the Big Ten coaches for the third team.

Preview

Their 2008–09 pre-conference schedule included Atlantic Coast Conference members Maryland Terrapins and Duke Blue Devils, who went on to win the 2009 ACC men's basketball tournament. The team also played against geographical rival Eastern Michigan and the preseason #2 ranked Connecticut Huskies.

Unlike conference rivals Michigan State, Purdue, and Wisconsin, Michigan was not ranked in the top 25 by either the Associated Press or the ESPN/USA Today preseason polls. In fact, the team did not even receive any votes, like rival Ohio State, in either poll.  Pre season reports described the team as a contender for fifth place in the conference.  Although the team was building from a 10–22 record, it won five of its last ten games the prior year.  A poll of 22 members of the media published in the Detroit Free Press ranked Michigan eighth in the conference.  The Sports Illustrated 2008 College Basketball Preview issue did not select the team as one of the five predicted Big Ten teams (the four mentioned above and the Minnesota Golden Gophers) to qualify for the NCAA tournament.

Roster

On May 5, 2008, sophomore Epke Udoh, the Big Ten's top shotblocker, decided to transfer for his final two years of athletic eligibility. Beilein attempted to replace Udoh with Robin Benzing, a member of Germany's national youth team. However, Benzing failed to meet the NCAA's initial-eligibility guidelines and did not play. Beilein was able to partially solve the problem of complimenting Manny Harris by luring point guard Laval Lucas-Perry to transfer from Arizona. Perry became eligible to play at the conclusion of the fall semester.  The team anticipated relying on  freshman center Ben Cronin to make up for the loss of Udoh and Ron Coleman, who averaged over 21 minutes each of his four seasons.  Including Cronin, the team had three incoming recruits.

Michigan granted two of its scholarships to fifth-year redshirt graduate students C.J. Lee and David Merritt in September.  Lee and Merritt had both been 2007–08 Big Ten Academic All-Conference selections.  The varsity roster included fourteen players, thirteen of whom saw live game action. In December, the Wolverines made the decision to redshirt Ben Cronin after only 10 minutes of play.  He had hip surgery on January 14.

 – denotes class status adjusted for used redshirt eligibility.

Incoming signees

The incoming class had no four- or five-star recruits. However, it included three players that Rivals.com listed as three-star recruits. Only Ben Cronin was also listed as three-star by scout.com.

Mid-season transfer

2009–10 team recruits
Incoming recruit Darius Morris and two Division I recruit teammates led Windward High School to the California Division V state title. Darius Morris received MVP of Olympic League, CIF Division 5A Southern Section Player of Year, and CIF Division 5A State Player of Year. Also Darius was awarded a John Wooden High School Player of the Year Award, received by Jrue Holiday the year before and the likes of Jason Kapono and Tayshaun Prince in the past.

Matt Vogrich won the Illinois Gatorade Player of the Year award, following in the footsteps of Derrick Rose and Jon Scheyer.  Unlike Scheyer and Rose, he did not win Illinois Mr. Basketball.   Kelvin Grady announced his intent to transfer at the end of the season.

Rankings

Playing style
Over the course of the season, they developed a reputation for shooting a lot of three-point shots and for not turning over the basketball. The team ranked among the national leaders in three-point shots made per game. The ballhandling ability was a function of the Michigan lineup which often employed four guards and one center/forward, which meant that at any time the team had several adept ballhandlers on the court. As a team that relied on the three-point shot, it was streaky and was susceptible to hot and cold stretches. The team relied on a deep bench and had 10 players who averaged 10 minutes per game. Even the eleventh player averaged 9.6 minutes. The offense used patient ball movement with backdoor cutters and slashers, which necessitated that defenses chase shooters and peel off picks. The offense resulted in a shot mix that employed three-pointers for about 48% of its shots.

On defense, the team was known for employing Beilein's trademark trapping 1–3–1 halfcourt zone defense, which required opponents to be skilled at perimeter passing.  The zone defense was generally employed after made baskets and dead-ball situations. After offensive misses or turnovers, the Wolverines relied on man-to-man defense. Depending on the matchups the team also used a 2–3 zone defense because the team did not have the type of athletes necessary to play on the wings of his 1–3–1. It employed the 1–3–1 less later in the season, and about ten percent of opponent possessions altogether. In total, the team used some sort of zone defense about 40 percent of the time.  The team was also among the top 35 (of over 300) in the nation in terms of three-point shot defense.

Accomplishments
On December 13, 2008, the team tied Dartmouth’s current  national record for most different players to make a three-point field goal in game set in 1993 when 9 players made three-point shots against Eastern Michigan. The team also set the current Big Ten Conference single-game three-point field goals attempted record of 42 on December 22, 2008 against Florida Gulf Coast and the conference games record of 40 on January 7, 2009 against Indiana.  Over the course of the season the team set the current Big Ten Conference single-season three-point field goals attempted record if 912 as well as the single-season conference games record of 471.  The team led the Big Ten Conference with 151 three-point field goals made in conference games.

The team set several school records. Its single-season total of 305 three-point field goals made surpassed the 1998 school record total of 260. This record was surpassed by the 2013–14 team. The team's single-game total of 16 three-point field goals made against Eastern Michigan on December 13, 2008 surpassed the school record 15 made on February 22, 1998.  The team also established the school’s single-season free throw percentage record of 75.7% (412–544) surpassed the 75.4% set in 2002.

Season

Preconference

Although the Big Ten Network had a two and a half hour special that featured Midnight Madness events from several Big Ten campuses on October 17, 2008, the Michigan Wolverines were not a featured part of the show. Michigan began the season with Ben Cronin suffering from a torn acetabular labrum (hip joint) and considering redshirting. The team started its season as the host of a 2K Sports College Hoops Coaches Vs. Manny Harris won the second Big Ten Player of the week award of his career for his performances during these games.

The first two victories qualified Michigan to appear in the tournament final four at the Madison Square Garden where the unranked Wolverines team upset the #4 ranked UCLA Bruins men's basketball team for its first win over a top-five team in eleven years on November 20, 2008. The 55–52 win also ended a twelve-game losing streak against ranked opponents.  During the game, Michigan forced 17 UCLA turnovers with its 1–3–1 zone defense.  Nonetheless, Michigan fell behind by as many as 10 points at one point in the game.  In the first half, the Wolverines shot 31.3% from the field, and in the second half, they shot 61.9%, including 4 of 8 on three-point shots.  Michigan trailed by two with 4 minutes and 16 seconds left before Stu Douglass made a three-point basket and Sims scored a few possessions later after a steal.  In the final seconds UCLA's Nikola Dragovic hit a 3-point shot with five seconds left to reduce Michigan's four-point lead to one. Then UCLA sent Harris to the line where he made two free throws. In the final seconds Michigan defended an attack by Darren Collison who had his final shot blocked by Harris.  At that point in the season, Michigan used DeShawn Sims as a sixth man. He played 28 minutes off the bench and led the team in scoring with 18 while being tied for the lead with 5 rebounds. Despite losing to #10 ranked (#5 in the Coaches' Poll) Duke the following night, the Wolverines began receiving votes in the 2008-09 NCAA Division I men's basketball rankings for the week of November 24.

The team earned a pair of non-conference victories against  and Savannah State.  In the Savannah St. game, Sims made a jump shot from the corner as time expired to win the game in overtime. Michigan had trailed by 20 at halftime, but scored the first 15 points of the second half. Next, the team was matched up against the Maryland in the ACC–Big Ten Challenge, where they lost on December 3.  The Maryland game marked Sims' entry into the starting lineup.

On December 6, 2008 Michigan posted its second consecutive win over a top 5 opponent in a rematch against Duke with an 81–73 victory. The game included 11 lead changes and 16 ties. The close contest allowed the fans to play a part as they forced Duke to use a time out to quiet the noisy crowd late in the second half.  The game, which had an attendance of 13,751, marked Michigan's 168th sellout and eighth consecutive as host to Duke.  Sims, in his new starting role, led the way with 28 points (a career-high) and 12 rebounds. Novak contributed 14 off the bench including 4 for 7 on three-point shots.  Gerald Henderson fouled out in only 19 minutes of play.  Michigan trailed 53–50 with 8 minutes and 38 seconds remaining before Novak hit three-point shots on consecutive possessions to give Michigan the lead for good. Michigan built a 68–59 lead with 3 minutes and 7 seconds left. Then, Duke made four straight three-point shots while Michigan made 13 of its last 14 free throws to defend its lead.  The fourth three-pointer cut the lead to 75–71 with 51.3 seconds remaining.  The game was the first time Michigan had defeated multiple top five teams in the same season since 1986–87 when it upended fifth-ranked Syracuse, 91–88 (January 18, 1987), second-ranked Iowa, 100–92 (January 31, 1987), and third-ranked Purdue, 104–68 (March 7, 1987).  At that point in the season, Michigan's two wins against top five teams were as many as the rest of the nation combined.

Then, after beating Eastern Michigan the following week, they welcomed Laval Lucas-Perry to the lineup as he contributed 14 points in 16 minutes of play in a victory over the Oakland Golden Grizzlies. Two days later on December 22, Michigan entered the Associated Press top 25 poll for the first time since February 6, 2006. This performance earned him his second career Big Ten Player of the Week award. On December 29, the team entered the top 25 of the ESPN/USA Today Coaches Poll.

Big Ten Season

The win made Michigan the first ranked team that Wisconsin defeated during the season after three previous losses. During the game Zack Novak scored his season high 20 points, but Harris was held to 9 points and Wisconsin shot 58.7% from the field. On January 4, the team earned its first conference victory against the Illinois Fighting Illini when five player chipped in with double digit scoring efforts and the defense induced a low shooting percentage in the second half. The loss during the week caused Michigan to fall from the top 25 of both polls. Michigan rallied from a 20-point deficit against the Indiana Hoosiers to force overtime in which it prevailed on January 7. It was the team's first victory in Bloomington, Indiana since 1995. On January 11, defeated the Iowa Hawkeyes marking eight wins in nine games starting with the Duke upset. Michigan opened a 32–16 lead and was never challenged afterwards. Following the Indiana and Iowa victories, Michigan moved back into the top 25 in both polls (AP #25, ESPN/USAT #24).

Beilein stayed at 499 career wins at four-year academic institutions, as Michigan suffered its first consecutive losses of the season when its second conference loss, which came against Illinois on January 14, was followed by a loss to the Ohio State Buckeyes on January 17. The Illinois contest was a rematch from ten days earlier. After a 31–30 Michigan halftime lead resulting from 11 lead changes, Illinois shut down Michigan early in the second half to build a 57–45 lead with 5 minutes remaining. In the game, Michigan did not attempt a free throw until the last 1 minute and 45 seconds of the second half.  Against Ohio State, Michigan struggled against a 1–2–2 zone early in the game and fell behind by 11 before closing to a 29–25 halftime deficit. Michigan took a 44–40 lead with eight minutes remaining, and the score was tied at 47 before Ohio State ran off 10 points in a row. The game was a twentieth year celebration of the last Wolverine national championship with all but two members of the 1989 NCAA Division I men's basketball tournament championship team in attendance as the team wore throwback uniforms.  The consecutive losses caused the team to lose almost all of their support in the national rankings.  On January 20, in a contest against Penn State that pitted the conferences two leading scorers (Harris and Talor Battle), Michigan shot 9 for 30 from the field in the first half including 2 for 16 on three-point shot attempts. They fell behind by as many as 23 points in the second half. The loss extended the losing streak to three games. Although Michigan rebounded with Beilein's 500th win in a January 24 victory over Northwestern in which they scored on their first five possessions and never looked back,  they lost all support among the voters in the polls.

Michigan ended January with a pair of losses to Ohio State and Purdue. The Ohio State game was notable for Novak's flagrant foul and ejection for elbowing P.J. Hill in the face. Harris accumulated a triple double of sorts with 22 points, 12 rebounds and 10 turnovers.  Against Purdue, Harris was held to single digit scoring for the third time in four games. During the game he was ejected for elbowing Purdue captain Chris Kramer in the nose, which spurred Purdue to a 40–20 run.  Novak was ineligible due to an ejection in the prior game and Harris was ejected toward the beginning of the second half.  On February 5, Harris was selected as a John R. Wooden Award 2008–09 Midseason Top 30 Candidate. After starting February play by snapping the two-game losing streak against Penn State on February 5, Michigan lost consecutive games to top ten opponents: Connecticut Huskies (#1) and Michigan State Spartans (#9). Harris posted a 28 points as Michigan rallied from a two-point halftime deficit to win by 20 against Penn State.  Although Michigan confused Connecticut with a 2–3 zone defense instead of its normal 1–3–1 zone, which forced 10 first-half turnovers, Connecticut was victorious. The 11th double double of the season by Hasheem Thabeet helped Connecticut overcome only its second halftime deficit. Michigan stayed in the game in part due to six three-pointers by Stu Douglass.  The loss against Michigan State marked 7 losses in 9 games for Michigan and gave Michigan State a 7–0 road record.  On February 15, Michigan raised its record to 3–0 in overtime games in a victory over the Northwestern Wildcats on the road.  Michigan took a 56–51 lead with 1 minute and 44 seconds left, but let it slip away. Michigan never trailed in the overtime. Then four days later, they posted their first consecutive win since a three-game streak from January 4 — 11 with a victory over the Minnesota Golden Gophers. In the game, Novak posted a career-best 6 three-pointers.

Michigan suffered an 80–70 overtime loss at the hands of ten-place Big Ten foe, Iowa, on February 22. Michigan had led 56–52 with 1 minute and 13 seconds remaining in regulation before allowing four straight free throws by Matt Gatens.  The game was notable because Harris did not play during the overtime.  At the time of the benching, Harris was in a battle with fellow sophomores Talor Battle and Evan Turner for the Big Ten Scoring leadership.  Beilein commented on the benching: "That's what we had to do to make our team better now and in the future.".  In the subsequent game against #16-ranked Purdue, Michigan won 87–78, raising its record to 3–4 against ranked opponents on the season. Harris was one of Michigan's leaders with 27 points and 8 rebounds, while Sims had a career-high 29 points.  On March 1, Michigan lost to Wisconsin 60–55. After taking a 34–32 halftime lead, Michigan opened the second half shooting 1 for 12. Michigan closed the contest to a 52–50 game with 3 minutes and 55 seconds remaining. They stayed close as Wisconsin missed four of eight late free throws.  Prior to the final game of the season, the Wolverines adopted the slogan "Queme los barcos," which means "burn the ships" and which had been used by 16th-century Spanish conquistador Hernando Cortez as a command to his troops to remind them that there was no turning back in their battle with the Aztec. The team traded in their traditional warmup jersey's for shirts with their adopted slogan.  On March 7, they recovered from a 51–39 deficit to win their conference finale against Minnesota. Laval Lucas-Perry scored a career-high 19 points, including three straight three-pointers after Minnesota opened up the 12-point lead. Of the three teams that were ranked at the end of February and that Michigan had played twice (Duke, Illinois and Purdue), Michigan split the two games against each opponent, winning against each at home.

Postseason
Michigan concluded its regular season with a 19–12 (9–9 Big Ten) record. This earned the team a tie for seventh place in the conference standings with Minnesota. Since Michigan swept the season series with a February 19, 74–62 win at home and a March 7, 67–64 win at Minnesota, Michigan was seeded seventh in the 2009 Big Ten Conference men's basketball tournament held at the Conseco Fieldhouse in Indianapolis, Indiana while Minnesota was seeded eighth.  During Championship Week, the Wolverines defeated the number ten seeded Iowa Hawkeyes on March 12 by a 73–45 margin. Sims helped Michigan open a 22–9 lead by scoring 16 of his 27 points in the first 10 minutes.  Then the team lost to the number two seeded Illinois Fighting Illini on March 13. Sims scored 15 and Harris was held to 9.

Michigan continued to wear warmup shirts with the team slogan at the 2009 NCAA Division I men's basketball tournament. In the tournament, where Michigan earned the number 10 seed, the team defeated the Clemson Tigers 62–59 on March 19 in Kansas City. At one point, Michigan held a 16-point lead. After Harris gave Michigan a 58–43 lead with 5:51 remaining, Clemson had a 14–0 run to cut the deficit to 58–57 with 49 seconds left. Harris completed a three-point play on a driving layup with 37.4 second left.  During the game, Clemson's top shooter Terrence Oglesby was ejected for a flagrant foul.  The Wolverines lost in the second-round game played on March 21, 2009 to the 2-seeded Oklahoma in a 73–63.  During the game four of Michigan's five starters who were trying to defend against Blake Griffin spent much of the game in foul trouble with Harris and Lee fouling out and Novak and Sims finishing with four fouls. Although Michigan tried a variety of defenders and various approaches such as doubling him, sagging in the lane, bumping him, Griffin still posted 33 points and 17 rebounds.

Awards and honors
No Wolverines were drafted into the 2009 NBA draft after the season. Before, during and after the season, individual players earned the following awards and honors:
Manny Harris
Preseason first-team All-Big Ten
11/17/09 Big Ten Player of the Week
John R. Wooden Award 2008–09 Midseason Top 30 Candidate
National Association of Basketball Coaches Division I All‐District team
U.S. Basketball Writers Association 2008–09 Men's District V All-District Team
Postseason first-team All-Big Ten
Big Ten Academic All-Conference

DeShawn Sims
12/22/08 Big Ten Player of the Week
Postseason All-Big Ten second-team (media), third-team (coaches)

C. J. Lee
Big Ten Sportsmanship Award (Michigan)
Big Ten Academic All-Conference

David Merritt
Big Ten Academic All-Conference

Laval Lucas-Perry
Big Ten Academic All-Conference

Statistical leadership
Harris led the Big Ten in free throw percentage according to some sources who recognize a 2.5 free throws made per game minimum, but was considered second according to the conference website that uses a 2 FTM/game minimum. The NCAA recognizes a 2.5 attempts per game minimum.  Thus, according to the Big Ten Gatens is the Conference Free Throw Champion and according to the NCAA Harris is the champion. Harris and Sims were both ranked among the leaders in the Conference in several statistics and divided the team leadership in most statistics. Harris led the Wolverines in points, minutes, assists, free throws made, free throw percentage and steals, while Sims led the team in field goal percentage, rebounds and blocked shots.  Although Harris led the team in scoring for the season, Sims led the team in scoring in all its victories against ranked teams during the regular season and during the last five games before the NCAA tournament, while the team was on the bubble.   However, Harris and Turner became the 4th and 5th players in conference history to finish in the top ten in the conference in average points, rebounds, and assists for a season since assists became a statistic in 1983–84, following Steve Smith, Jim Jackson, and Brian Evans.  After, Harris was named team MVP, he requested that Sims be recognized as co-MVP.  Sims was recognized as co-MVP.

The team posted the following statistics:

Schedule

|-
!colspan=9| Exhibition
|-
| Ex.
| November 6
|  (exhibition)
| 81–55
| DeShawn Sims – 19
| DeShawn Sims – 9
| Stu Douglass – 6
| Crisler Arena, Ann Arbor, MI (6,701)
| 
|-
!colspan=9| 2008–09 NCAA Division I Regular Season
|-
| 1
| November 11
| 
| 77–55
| Manny Harris (1) – 30
| Sims (1) – 12
| Stu Douglass (1) – 4
| Crisler Arena, Ann Arbor, MI (6,328)
| 1–0
|-
| 2
| November 12
| 
| 76–56
| Harris (2) – 26
| Harris (1) – 10
| Harris (1) – 8
| Crisler Arena, Ann Arbor, MI (6,246)
| 2–0
|-
| 3
| November 20
| UCLA (#4)
| 55–52
| Sims (1) – 18
| Harris (2)/Sims (2) – 5
| Douglass (2) – 4
| Madison Square Garden, New York (9,440)
| 3–0
|-
| 4
| November 21
| Duke (#10)
| 56–71
| Harris (3) – 25
| Zack Gibson (1) – 5
| Kelvin Grady (1) – 6
| Madison Square Garden, New York (12,543)
| 3–1
|-
| 5
| November 25
| 
| 83–49
| Harris (4) – 16
| Harris (3) – 15
| Grady (2) – 5
| Crisler Arena, Ann Arbor, MI (7,544)
| 4–1
|-
| 6
| November 29
| Savannah State
| 66–64 (OT)
| Sims (2) – 23
| Sims (3) – 12
| Harris (2)  – 3
| Crisler Arena, Ann Arbor, MI (8,190)
| 5–1
|-

| 7
| December 3
| @ Maryland
| 70–75
| Manny Harris (5)  – 15
| DeShawn Sims (4) – 7
| Harris (3)/Jevohn Shepherd (1)  – 4
| Comcast Center, College Park, MD (17,950)
| 5–2
|-
| 8
| December 6
| Duke (#4)
| 81–73
| Sims (3) – 28
| Sims (5) – 12
| Kelvin Grady (3) – 4
| Crisler Arena, Ann Arbor, MI (13,751)
| 6–2
|-
| 9
| December 13
| Eastern Michigan
| 91–60
| Harris (6) – 22
| Harris (4) – 7
| Harris (4) – 5
| Crisler Arena, Ann Arbor, MI (9,768)
| 7–2
|-
| 10
| December 20
| @Oakland
| 89–76
| Sims (4) – 20
| Sims (6) – 9
| Harris (5) – 13
| The Palace of Auburn Hills, Auburn Hills, MI (10,113)
| 8–2
|-
| 11
| December 22
| 
| 76–59
| Sims (5) – 20
| Sims (7) – 20
| Harris (6) – 5
| Crisler Arena, Ann Arbor, MI (8,279)
| 9–2
|-
| 12
| December 29
| 
| 77–57
| Harris (7) – 29
| Harris (5) – 16
| Harris (7) – 7
| Crisler Arena, Ann Arbor, MI (10,390)
| 10–2
|-
!colspan=9| 2008–09 Big Ten Conference Season
|-
| 13
| December 31
| Wisconsin
| 61–73
| Zack Novak (1) – 20
| Novak (1) – 8
| Harris (8) – 3
| Crisler Arena, Ann Arbor, MI (11,046)
| 10–3 (0–1)
|-

| 14
| January 4
| Illinois
| 74–64
| Manny Harris (8) – 16
| DeShawn Sims (8) – 9
| Harris (9)/Laval Lucas-Perry (1) – 5
| Crisler Arena, Ann Arbor, MI (12,912)
| 11–3 (1–1)
|-
| 15
| January 7
| @Indiana
| 72–66 (OT)
| Lucas-Perry (1) – 18
| Harris (6) – 11
| Kelvin Grady (4) – 4
| Assembly Hall, Bloomington, IN (11,044)
| 12–3 (2–1)
|-
| 16
| January 11
| Iowa
| 64–49
| Harris (9) – 18
| Harris (7) – 8
| Harris (10) – 5
| Crisler Arena, Ann Arbor, MI (11,835)
| 13–3 (3–1)
|-
| 17
| January 14
| @Illinois
| 51–66
| Harris (10) – 20
| Zack Novak (2) – 9
| Harris (11) – 3
| Assembly Hall, Champaign, IL (15,535)
| 13–4 (3–2)
|-
| 18
| January 17
| Ohio State
| 58–65
| Harris (11) – 21
| Harris (8) – 7
| Harris (12) – 6
| Crisler Arena, Ann Arbor, MI (13,751)
|  13–5 (3–3)
|-
| 19
| January 20
| @Penn State
| 58–73
| Sims (6) – 21
| Sims (9) – 11
| Douglass (3) – 3
| Bryce Jordan Center, State College, PA (8,730)
| 13–6 (3–4)
|-
| 20
| January 24
| Northwestern
| 68–59
| Sims (7) – 15
| Harris (9) – 12
| Harris (13)/C.J. Lee (1)/Lucas-Perry (2) – 4
| Crisler Arena, Ann Arbor, MI (11,468)
| 14–6 (4–4)
|-
| 21
| January 28
| @Ohio State
| 54–72
| Harris (12) – 22
| Harris (10) – 12
| Grady (5)/Harris (14)/Lee (2) – 3
| Jerome Schottenstein Center Columbus, OH (16,363)
| 14–7 (4–5)
|-
| 22
| January 31
| @Purdue (#16)
| 49–67
| Sims (8)/Jevohn Shepherd (1) – 10
| Sims (10) – 5
| Grady (6)/Stu Douglass (4) – 4
| Mackey Arena, West Lafayette, IN
| 14–8 (4–6)
|-

| 23
| February 5
| Penn State
| 71–51
| Manny Harris (13) – 28
| DeShawn Sims (11) – 7
| Harris (15) – 7
| Crisler Arena, Ann Arbor, MI (10,134)
| 15–8 (5–6)
|-
| 24
| February 7
| @Connecticut (#1)
| 61–69
| Stu Douglass (1) – 20
| Zack Gibson (1)/Harris (11)/Sims (12) – 4
| Harris (16) – 5
| Harry A. Gampel Pavilion, Storrs, CT (10,167)
| 15–9 (5–6)
|-
| 25
| February 10
| Michigan State (#9)
| 42–54
| Sims (9) – 18
| Harris (12) – 7
| Harris (17)/Zack Novak (1) – 3
| Crisler Arena, Ann Arbor, MI (13,751)
| 15–10 (5–7)
|-
| 26
| February 15
| @ Northwestern
| 70–67 (OT)
| Harris (14) – 26
| Novak (3) – 7
| Stu Douglass (5) – 4
| Welsh-Ryan Arena, Evanston, IL (7,234)
| 16–10 (6–7)
|-
| 27
| February 19
| Minnesota
| 74–62
| Novak (2) – 18
| Sims (13) – 8
| C. J. Lee (3) – 4
| Crisler Arena, Ann Arbor, MI (10,520)
| 17–10 (7–7)
|-
| 28
| February 22
| @Iowa
| 60–70 (OT)
| Stu Douglass (2) – 14
| Sims (14) – 8
| Harris (18) – 6
| Carver-Hawkeye Arena, Iowa City, IA (14,462)
| 17–11 (7–8)
|-
| 29
| February 26
| Purdue (#16)
| 87–78
| Sims (10) – 29
| Harris (13) – 8
| Stu Douglass (6)/Harris (19) – 4
| Crisler Arena, Ann Arbor, MI (13,751)
| 18–11 (8–8)
|-

| 30
| March 1
| @Wisconsin
| 55–60
| DeShawn Sims (11) – 17
| Manny Harris (14) – 8
| C. J. Lee (4) – 4
| Kohl Center, Madison, WI (17,230)
| 18–12 (8–9)
|-
| 31
| March 7
| @Minnesota
| 67–64
| Sims (12) – 24
| Zack Gibson (2)/Harris (15)/Laval Lucas-Perry (1)/Sims (15) – 2
| Harris (20) – 6
| Williams Arena, Minneapolis, MN (14,625)
| 19–12 (9–9)
|-
!colspan=9| 2009 Big Ten Conference men's basketball tournament
|-
| 32/BT1
| March 12
| Iowa
| 73–45
| Sims (13) – 27
| Harris (16) – 7
| Harris (21) – 8
| Conseco Fieldhouse, Indianapolis, IN
| 20–12 (9–9)
|-
| 33/BT2
| March 13
| Illinois
| 50–60
| Sims (14) – 15
| Sims (16) – 8
| Harris (22) – 4
| Conseco Fieldhouse, Indianapolis, IN
| 20–13 (9–9)
|-
!colspan=9| 2009 NCAA Division I men's basketball tournament
|-
| 34/NCAA1
| March 19
| Clemson (#24)
| 62–59
| Harris (15) – 23
| Harris (17) – 7
| Harris (23) – 6
| Sprint Center, Kansas City, Missouri
| 21–13 (9–9)
|-
| 35/NCAA2
| March 21
| Oklahoma (#7)
| 63–73
| Sims (15)/Anthony Wright (1) – 14
| Sims (17) – 6
| Harris (24) – 3
| Sprint Center, Kansas City, Missouri
| 21–14 (9–9)
|-

Bold text indicates game high; (nth time player led stat)

See also

Notes

External links
 stats @ ESPN

Michigan
Michigan
Michigan Wolverines men's basketball seasons
Michigan
Michigan